I'm Marrying the Director (German: Ich heirate Herrn Direktor) is a 1960 Austrian comedy film directed by Wolfgang Liebeneiner and starring Heidelinde Weis, Gerhard Riedmann and Hans Söhnker.

It was shot at the Schönbrunn Studios in Vienna. The film's sets were designed by the art directors Fritz Moegle and Heinz Ockermüller.

Synopsis
An ambitious young stenographer decides she is going to marry the director of her company, and sets out to woo him. However, she eventually meets a man of her own age and realises there is more to life than money.

Cast
 Heidelinde Weis as Brigitte
 Gerhard Riedmann as Franz Bogner
 Hans Söhnker as Direktor Georg Stahlmann
 Katharina Mayberg as Silvia Roscol
 Susi Nicoletti as Frau von Wittekind
 Senta Berger as Vera Bleichinger
 Adrienne Gessner as Luise Stahlmann
 Wolfgang Jansen as Peter Drill
 Fritz Muliar as Jahn
 Dorothea Neff as Frau Mahnke
 Fritz Hinz-Fabricius as Roscol
 Anton Mitterwurzer as Arthur Stahlmann
 Vera Balser-Eberle as Fräulein Schickedanz	
 Franz Eichberger as Polizist	
 Walter Lehr as Polizist
 Walter Regelsberger as Fahrer der Funkstreife
 Raoul Retzer as Kellner im Hotel
 Rudolf Strobl as Kommissar
 Gustav Knuth as Friedrich Kiesberg
 Hannelore Auer as Hannelore Auer
 Karl Farkas as Dr. Spunder

References

Bibliography 
 Bock, Hans-Michael & Bergfelder, Tim. The Concise CineGraph. Encyclopedia of German Cinema. Berghahn Books, 2009.

External links 
 

1960 films
Austrian comedy films
1960 comedy films
1960s German-language films
Films directed by Wolfgang Liebeneiner
Films shot at Schönbrunn Studios